Veer Teja Vidhya Mandir School is a co-educational day school for classes nursery to X located in Degana Tehsil, Rajasthan, India.

References

Schools in Rajasthan
Nagaur district
2000 establishments in Rajasthan
Educational institutions established in 2000